is a one-shot Japanese manga written and illustrated by Fumi Yoshinaga.

The series is licensed and published in English in North America by Digital Manga Publishing under its June imprint.

Manga
Ohta Publishing released the manga on January 24, 2004. Digital Manga Publishing, under its June imprint, released the manga on July 25, 2007.

Reception
Holly Ellingwood at Active Anime commends the manga for its "diversity, beautiful artwork, and imaginative romances of various kinds". Pop Culture Shock's Erin F. comments on the increasing "weirder and more depressing" shorts stories as the book progresses. Mania.com's Danielle Van Gorder commends the manga's art and panel layout which are "overall very minimalist, with sparse backgrounds where they are included at all, and fairly simple screentones, but it's a style that is used to great effect".

References

External links

2004 manga
Comedy-drama anime and manga
Digital Manga Publishing titles
Fumi Yoshinaga
Josei manga
Romance anime and manga
Yaoi anime and manga
Ohta Publishing manga